Otto Baumberger (21 May 1889 Altstetten, Zurich - 26 December 1961 Weiningen), was a noted Swiss painter and poster artist. Baumberger produced some 200 posters of great quality and style. His realistic rendering of a herringbone tweed coat became a classic of Swiss poster, an example of a Sachplakat (object poster).

References 

1889 births
1961 deaths
20th-century Swiss painters
20th-century Swiss male artists
Swiss male painters
Swiss poster artists
Alumni of the Académie de la Grande Chaumière
Academic staff of ETH Zurich